"I Can't Hear the Music" is a song by American R&B group Brutha, released September 30, 2008 by The Island Def Jam Music Group, as the lead single from their self-titled debut album, Brutha (2008). The song, which also serves as their debut single, was produced by Blac Elvis and features a guest verse from American rapper Fabolous.

Music video
The music video for "I Can't Hear the Music" was directed by Jessy Terrero, produced by Josh Goldstein. And cinematography by Brad Rushing.

Charts

References

External links

2008 debut singles
Brutha songs
Fabolous songs
Music videos directed by Jessy Terrero
Songs written by Blac Elvis
Songs written by Fabolous
2008 songs